Farid Mohammadizadeh (born 6 September 1994) is an Iranian footballer who plays for Gol Reyhan in the Azadegan League. He primarily plays as a right back.

Career statistics

References

1994 births
Living people
People from Qom
Iranian footballers
Association football defenders
Naft Tehran F.C. players
Persian Gulf Pro League players
Azadegan League players